Coleophora katunella is a moth of the family Coleophoridae. It is found in southern Russia.

References

katunella
Moths described in 1991
Moths of Europe